Ekrem Genç (Bulgarian: Екрем Генч; born 1 July 1974) is a former Bulgarian footballer.

Biography

Over the course of his career, Genç represented Arda Kardzhali, FC Chirpan, Etar 1924 and Beroe. During the 1997/1998 season in the A PFG he also played for CSKA Sofia.

References

1974 births
Living people
Bulgarian footballers
First Professional Football League (Bulgaria) players
PFC CSKA Sofia players
PFC Beroe Stara Zagora players
FC Etar 1924 Veliko Tarnovo players
FC Arda Kardzhali players
Bulgarian people of Turkish descent

Association footballers not categorized by position